I Still Love You can refer to:
 "I Still Love You" (The Vejtables song), 1965
 "I Still Love You" (Bee Gees song), 1981
 "I Still Love You" (Lil Suzy song), 1998
 "I Still Love You" (Jennifer Hudson song), 2015
 "I Still Love You", a 1982 song from the Kiss album Creatures of the Night
 "I Still Love You", a 1997 song from the Next album Rated Next
 "I Still Love You", a 2002 song from the 702 album Star
 "Je ne sais pas pourquoi" (Kylie Minogue song), also known as "I Still Love You (Je ne sais pas pourquoi)"
 "I Still Love You", a music track from Doki Doki Literature Club.
 "I still love you", a lyric from the Queen songs "Love of My Life" and "These Are the Days of Our Lives"
"Of Course I Still Love You", an autonomous spaceport drone ship by SpaceX